Mariakutty is a 1958 Indian Malayalam-language film, directed and written by Muttathu Varkey. The film stars Prem Nazir and Miss Kumari. It is based on Varkey's 1957 novel of the same name.

Plot

Cast 
 Prem Nazir as Pappachan
 Miss Kumari as Mariakutty
 K. V. Shanthi as Ruby
 Thikkurissy Sukumaran Nair as Variyalle Kuruvachan
 Bahadoor as Kasim
 Jose Prakash as Ponnappachan
 S. P. Pillai as Naanu
 T. S. Muthaiah as Thoma
 Changanasseri Chinnamma as Chacko's mother
 Abraham Joseph as Kucheri
 Aranmula Ponnamma as Achamma
 Baby Indira as Kuruvachan's youngdaughter
 William Thomas as Chacko
 Kottarakkara Sreedharan Nair as Kora
 T. D. Kusalakumari as Betty
 Nanukkuttan as Pillachan
 Pankajavalli as Annamma
 Thankam as Pathumma
Kottayam Shantha as Mariakutty's friend

Soundtrack 
The music was composed by Br. Lakshmanan. The song "Poonkuyil Paadidumbol" is based on "Bade Armaan Se Rakha Hai", composed by Roshan for Malhar (1951). "Karalil Kaniyum Rasamey" is based on "Amudhai Pozhiyum Nilave", composed by T. G. Lingappa for Thangamalai Ragasiyam (1957).

References

External links 
 

1950s Malayalam-language films
1958 films
Films based on Indian novels
Films directed by P. Subramaniam
Films scored by Br Lakshmanan